The history of Argentine cuisine is rich and diverse. As a land that has experienced extensive immigration through many years, the country has benefited from numerous food influences. The diverse climate in the region, ranging from subtropical to subpolar, has also helped to considerably broaden the set of ingredients readily available. European settlers are largely responsible for Argentina's cuisine, mostly the Italians and Spaniards. However, other immigrants such as Germans, the French, Jews and the British, among others, brought their styles of cooking and national recipes with them. Nevertheless, indigenous gastronomies derived from groups such as the Quechua, Mapuche, and Guarani have also played a role; for example, mate is consumed throughout the country.

Timeline
Several Indigenous peoples lived in Argentina long before the European colonizers arrived. Indigenous peoples inhabiting the territory that is now the Argentine Northwest were farmers who grew squash, melons, and sweet potatoes. The Guaraní, who lived in the northeast, were hunter gatherers. Spanish settlers came to Argentina in 1536 and introduced cattle to the Pampas, which would have a profound effect on the cuisine of Argentina.

Throughout the 19th century, millions of immigrants arrived to Argentina. Most were from Italy and Spain. The Italians introduced pizza, as well as many pasta dishes, including spaghetti and lasagna. The British started the tradition of teatime. The French, German, Welsh, Swiss, Jewish, Central and Eastern Europeans have also influenced the country's cuisine.

In 1931, renown Afro-Argentine chef Antonio Gonzaga published Argentina's first cookbook, El cocinero práctico argentino ("The Practical Argentine Cookbook"), credited as the first cookbook in Argentina. The book detailed traditional Argentine cuisine with painstaking effort, chronicling over 300 recipes. Gonzaga's unabashed focus on traditional Argentine cooking (specifically, that of the gauchos and the rural working class) is credited with popularizing asado in Buenos Aires and among the Argentine upper classes, who until then disdained Argentine traditions and instead favored French cuisine. In particular, the use of achuras such as chorizo and chitterlings, and the steps for preparing the asado, are credited to Gonzaga's recipes in El cocinero práctico.

Gonzaga's popularity was eventually overshadowed by another famous Argentine cookbook writer, Doña Petrona, who would go on to revolutionize the field by becoming Argentina's first television chef.

References